The Württemberg Tssd was a class of German  narrow gauge, steam locomotive operated by the Royal Württemberg State Railways.

History
They were initially deployed on the Öchsle Railway in 1899 between Biberach an der Riß and Ochsenhausen. In addition they worked the Federsee Railway between Schussenried and Riedlingen, the Zabergäu Railway between Lauffen am Neckar and Leonbronn and the Bottwar Railway between Marbach am Neckar and Heilbronn Süd. A total of nine units were delivered in three series of three engines in 1899, 1901 and 1904 with fleet numbers 41–49. They were initially classified as Tss locomotives and later as Tssd 41–49.

Today duplex locomotives are described as compound locomotives.

All the engines were taken over by Deutsche Reichsbahn-Gesellschaft and given the numbers 99 631 to 99 639. After the Second World War four engines were still in service. They were retired as follows:
Number 99 638 – 26 October 1954
Number 99 639 – 27 November 1956
Number 99 637 – 25 March 1965
Number 99 633 – 18 March 1969

Preserved locomotives
Two locomotives, numbers 99 633 and 99 637 have been preserved.

Locomotive 99 633 was under the ownership of the German Railway History Company (DGEG) and was loaned to the Öchsle Schmalspurbahn (Öchsle Narrow-Gauge Railway) and displayed in the Ochsenhausen shed, its original home. In 2007 the society bought it outright. Since the very first transmission of the SWR television programme, Eisenbahn-Romantik, it has featured in the introduction and the programme's logo.

Number 99 637 is on display as a monument at the former station forecourt in Bad Buchau, its last home station.

See also 
Royal Württemberg State Railways
List of Württemberg locomotives and railbuses

References

Mallet locomotives
Tssd
0-4-4-0T locomotives
750 mm gauge locomotives
Narrow gauge steam locomotives of Germany
Esslingen locomotives
B′B n4vt locomotives